Heteropsylla is a genus of plant-parasitic hemipterans in the family Psyllidae. There are more than 40 described species in Heteropsylla.

Species
These 41 species belong to the genus Heteropsylla:

 Heteropsylla aurantiaca Muddiman, Hodkinson & Hollis, 1992
 Heteropsylla bidentata Muddiman, Hodkinson & Hollis, 1992
 Heteropsylla boquetensis (Brown & Hodkinson, 1988)
 Heteropsylla brevigenis Burckhardt, 1987
 Heteropsylla caldwelli Burckhardt, 1987
 Heteropsylla clavata Muddiman, Hodkinson & Hollis, 1992
 Heteropsylla crawfordi Enderlein, 1918
 Heteropsylla crenata Muddiman, Hodkinson & Hollis, 1992
 Heteropsylla cubana Crawford, 1914
 Heteropsylla curta Muddiman, Hodkinson & Hollis, 1992
 Heteropsylla didubiata Caldwell, 1944
 Heteropsylla distincta Tuthill, 1944
 Heteropsylla expansa Muddiman, Hodkinson & Hollis, 1992
 Heteropsylla flammula Muddiman, Hodkinson & Hollis, 1992
 Heteropsylla flexuosa Muddiman, Hodkinson & Hollis, 1992
 Heteropsylla forcipata Crawford, 1914
 Heteropsylla fusca Crawford, 1914
 Heteropsylla huasachae Crawford, 1914
 Heteropsylla intermedia Muddiman, Hodkinson & Hollis, 1992
 Heteropsylla maculosa Muddiman, Hodkinson & Hollis, 1992
 Heteropsylla mexica Crawford
 Heteropsylla mexicana Crawford, 1914
 Heteropsylla mimosae Crawford, 1914
 Heteropsylla muricata Muddiman, Hodkinson & Hollis, 1992
 Heteropsylla nebulosa Muddiman, Hodkinson & Hollis, 1992
 Heteropsylla obscura Muddiman, Hodkinson & Hollis, 1992
 Heteropsylla procera Muddiman, Hodkinson & Hollis, 1992
 Heteropsylla propinqua Muddiman, Hodkinson & Hollis, 1992
 Heteropsylla proximata Muddiman, Hodkinson & Hollis, 1992
 Heteropsylla puertoricoensis Caldwell, 1942
 Heteropsylla pulchella Hodkinson & Muddiman, 1993
 Heteropsylla pulchra Tuthill, 1964
 Heteropsylla quassiae Crawford, 1914
 Heteropsylla reducta Caldwell & Martorell, 1952
 Heteropsylla setosa Muddiman, Hodkinson & Hollis, 1992
 Heteropsylla spinulosa Muddiman, Hodkinson & Hollis, 1992
 Heteropsylla tenuata Muddiman, Hodkinson & Hollis, 1992
 Heteropsylla texana Crawford, 1914 (mesquite psyllid)
 Heteropsylla truncata Muddiman, Hodkinson & Hollis, 1992
 Heteropsylla tuthilli Burckhardt, 1987
 Heteropsylla virgulata Muddiman, Hodkinson & Hollis, 1992

References

External links

 

Psyllidae
Articles created by Qbugbot